SS Tanais, mistakenly referred to as Danae or Danais (Δανάη / Δαναΐς), was a British-built, Greek-owned cargo ship that German occupation forces in Greece requisitioned in World War II. On 9 June 1944, a Royal Navy submarine sank her off Heraklion, Crete, killing hundreds of deported Cretan Jews, Cretan Christian civilians and Italian POWs aboard. Sources differ as to the number killed; estimates vary between 425 and 1,000.

The ship
John Blumer and Co Ltd of Sunderland, England built the ship as Holywood for William France, Fenwick and Company of London. She was launched on 14 December 1906 and completed in January 1907. She was a cargo steamship, and France, Fenwick operated her in the tramp trade.

A Greek shipowner, Stefanos Synodinos, bought her in 1935, renamed her Tanais after the ancient Greek city of Tanais in the Don delta and registered her in Piraeus.

On 26 May 1941 during the Battle of Crete the Luftwaffe sank Tanais in Souda Bay. MMR used her to carry cargo and people between the Aegean Islands and Greek mainland.

Sinking

On late 8 or early 9 June 1944 Tanais, escorted by the submarine hunter UJ 2142 and guard ships GK 05 and GK 06, sailed from Heraklion bound for Piraeus. In her holds were three groups of prisoners: about 265 Jews deported from Chania who had been rounded up a few days before, up to 400 Cretan gentiles linked with the Cretan resistance, and between 100 and 300 pro-Badoglio Italian prisoners of war who had been arrested after the Armistice of Cassibile. Sources differ as to the numbers of Cretan and Italian prisoners. Among those on board the ship were Jews from Crete. On 20 May 1944 276 Cretan Jews were arrested and loaded together with Greek underground fighters on the Tanais which made its way to the port of Piraeus. The plan was to transfer the community to the Haidari concentration camp and from there to deport them to Auschwitz.

Two hit Tanais, sinking her in just 12 seconds. The number of victims is unknown, but it is believed to include most of the people aboard. One source says only 14 people survived; another puts the total rescued at 51.

See also

References

External links

1906 ships
1941 in Greece
1944 in Greece
Crete in World War II
Maritime incidents in May 1941
Maritime incidents in June 1944
Ships built on the River Wear
Ships sunk by British submarines
Shipwrecks of Greece
Steamships of Germany
Steamships of Greece
Steamships of the United Kingdom
World War I merchant ships of the United Kingdom
World War II merchant ships of Germany
World War II merchant ships of Greece
World War II shipwrecks in the Aegean Sea